Constantin Cristian Dima (born 21 July 1999) is a Romanian professional footballer who plays as a defender.

Club career
A product of Dinamo București's academy, Dima started his professional career in Liga II side Sportul Snagov, where he played 25 matches and scored once during the 2016-17 campaign.

Desna Chernihiv
In January 2021, he moved to Desna Chernihiv, the main club in the city of Chernihiv, signing a three-and-a-half-year contract and becoming the first Romanian player of Desna's history. The club paid 100,000 euros for Dima, with Astra supposed to receive 20% of the amount of any Dima's resale.

On 30 January 2021, he made his debut in a friendly match against KF Shkëndija, replacing Andriy Mostovyi. On 31 January 2021, he played in the friendly match against PFC Lokomotiv Tashkent. On 3 February 2021, he played against Ahrobiznes in a friendly match won 4-0 by Desna. On 4 February 2021, he played against Rudar in a 2-0 friendly match victory for Desna. On 26 February 2021 he made his Ukrainian Premier League debut against Inhulets Petrove at the Valeriy Lobanovskyi Dynamo Stadium, replacing Pylyp Budkivskyi in the second half of a fixture won by his team 3-0.

On 16 July 2021, he was released by the club.

UTA Arad
On 4 October 2021, Dima joined UTA Arad in Liga I on a two-year deal, where he played 6 matches.

Chindia Târgoviște
In the summer of 2022, Dima moved to Chindia Târgoviște in Liga I. On 3 January 2023, he left the club by mutual consent.

International career
Dima has represented Romania national football team at numerous youth level: U17, U19 and U21. In May 2021, he was called up for the Romanian Olympic football team.

Career statistics

Club

Honours
Astra Giurgiu
Cupa României runner-up: 2018–19, 2020–21

References

External links
 Official Site of FC UTA Arad
 Official Site of Astra
 
 

1999 births
Living people
Footballers from Bucharest
Romanian footballers
Romanian expatriate footballers
Association football defenders
Liga I players
Liga II players
Ukrainian Premier League players
Expatriate footballers in Ukraine
Romanian expatriate sportspeople in Ukraine
FC Dinamo București players
CS Sportul Snagov players
Sepsi OSK Sfântu Gheorghe players
FC Viitorul Constanța players
FC Astra Giurgiu players
FC Desna Chernihiv players
FC UTA Arad players
AFC Chindia Târgoviște players